Siah Soltan (also Romanized as Sīāh Solţān and Seyāh Solţān; also known as Mīā Solţān, Mia Sultān, and Sīā Solţān) is a village in Hendudur Rural District, Sarband District, Shazand County, Markazi Province, Iran. At the 2006 census, its population was 101, in 19 families.

References 

Populated places in Shazand County